Hilco Capital is a British international company that specialises in restructuring and refinancing other companies.

Notable projects 
Hilco has been involved with these companies, and in some cases owning and operating them for a period of time:

United Kingdom 

 Adams Childrenswear
 Allders (original store closures)
 Allied Carpets
 Andys Records
 Bank
 Beatties of London
 Borders (UK)
 British Home Stores (cleared stores)
 Chapelle Jewellery & Watches
 Clintons (294 store closures)
 Courts plc
 Denby Pottery Company (debt, restructuring and management buyout)
 Elvi
 Ethel Austin
 Extreme Stores
 Faith
 Fashion Rocks
 Focus DIY
 Habitat (debt and restructuring)
 HMV (purchased in 2013)
 Homebase (purchased in June 2018) 
 Hypervalue
 ILVA (UK)
 JJB Sports (cleared stores)
 Kwik Save
 Litho Supplies
 Littlewoods
 Maplin (retailer) (Cleared stores)
 MFI Group
 MK One
 Music and Video Club
 Nicole Farhi (fashion label, sold in 2012)
 Owen Owen
 Peacocks (retail advisor during administration)
 Silverscreen
 Staples UK (Company name changed to SUK Retail Limited. Rebranded/trading as Office Outlet)
 Stationery Box
 Wilko
 Woolworths Group (store closures)

International 

Fletcher Jones (stores)
 Habitat (Iberia, France, Germany, Benelux)
 Kraus Flooring (purchased in 2012)
 WOW Sight & Sound
 Misco (purchased in 2017)

Canada

HMV Canada (purchased in 2011 and in receivership 2017)
Tilley Endurables  (acquired 2015)
Music World

Ireland
 HMV Ireland
 Xtra-Vision Ireland (purchased in 2013, defunct January 2016)
 A-wear previously operated Ireland's leading female clothing retailer

Criticism
In December 2018, The Times described the company as a vulture fund in an article about HMV going into administration.

References 

Financial services companies established in 2000
Restructuring
Financial services companies based in London